Jiangsu opera may refer to several distinct Chinese opera genres from Jiangsu province:

Kunqu
Suzhou opera
Wuxi opera
Huaihai opera, from northern Jiangsu
Yangzhou opera, from central Jiangsu